Mellvig is a surname. Notable people with the surname include:
 Börje Mellvig (1911–1998), Swedish actor and director
 Folke Mellvig (1913–1994), Swedish writer, brother of Börje